Plasmodium anasum is a species of the genus Plasmodium.

Like all species in this genus it has both vertebrate and insect hosts. The vertebrate host are reptiles.

Description 

This species was described by Telford in 1971.

The schizonts give rise to 8 to 30 merozoites.

The gametocytes are round to oval.

Geographical location 
This species is found in Venezuela and Panama.

Clinical features and pathological effects 
The only known host is the gecko Thecadactylus rapicaudus.

References 

aurulentum